Siege of Quebec may refer to: 

 Siege of Quebec (1759), prior to the Battle of the Plains of Abraham
 Siege of Quebec (1760), an unsuccessful French attempt to retake Quebec City from the British
 Siege of Quebec (1775), after the Battle of Quebec between American forces and British defenders

See also
 Battle of Quebec (disambiguation)